Tin(IV) iodide, also known as stannic iodide, is the chemical compound with the formula SnI4.  This tetrahedral molecule crystallizes as a bright orange solid that dissolves readily in nonpolar solvents such as benzene.

The compound is usually prepared by the reaction of iodine and tin:
Sn  +  2 I2  →   SnI4 
The compound hydrolyses in water. In aqueous hydroiodic acid, it reacts to form a rare example of a hexaiodometallate:
 SnI4  +  2 I−  →   [SnI6]2−

See also
Tin(II) iodide
Tin(IV) chloride

References

Tin(IV) compounds
Iodides
Metal halides